The 1985–86 season was the 77th year of football played by Dundee United, and covers the period from 1 July 1985 to 30 June 1986. United finished in third place, securing UEFA Cup football for the following season.

Match results
Dundee United played a total of 52 competitive matches during the 1985–86 season. The team finished third in the Scottish Premier Division.

In the cup competitions, United lost in the semi-final of the Scottish Cup to Hearts and to Aberdeen in the same round of the Skol Cup. Swiss side Neuchâtel Xamax eliminated United in the third round of the UEFA Cup.

Legend

All results are written with Dundee United's score first.

Premier Division

Scottish Cup

Skol Cup

UEFA Cup

League table

Transfers

In
The club signed one player during the season with a total public cost of £70,000. Two other players joined before the following season.

Out
Three players were sold by the club during the season.

Loans out

Playing kit

The shirts were sponsored for the first time – future chairman Eddie Thompson's VG Foodstores were the inaugural sponsors.

Trivia
 Undersoil heating was used for the first time on 27 November 1985 in the UEFA Cup match against Neuchâtel Xamax

See also
 1985–86 in Scottish football

References

Dundee United F.C. seasons
Dundee United